The 2022 NBA Summer League, also branded as the NBA 2K23 Summer League 2022, was an off-season competition held by the National Basketball Association (NBA) primarily at the Thomas and Mack Center and Cox Pavilion in Las Vegas, Nevada on the campus of University of Nevada, Las Vegas from July 7 to 17, 2022. The summer league consisted of the California Classic, Salt Lake City Summer League, and the Las Vegas NBA Summer League.

California Classic 
The Golden State Warriors hosted the fourth annual California Classic at the Chase Center on July 2, 3, and 5.

Teams 

 Golden State Warriors
 Los Angeles Lakers
 Miami Heat
 Sacramento Kings

Games

Day 1

Day 2

Day 3

Salt Lake City Summer League 
The Utah Jazz hosted a round-robin tournament in the Vivint Arena on July 5–7, the seventh year it has held its summer league.

Teams 

 Utah Jazz
 Oklahoma City Thunder
 Memphis Grizzlies
 Philadelphia 76ers

Games

Day 1

Day 2

Day 3

Las Vegas Summer League 
The Las Vegas NBA Summer League is an official summer league of the NBA—the sixteenth year it has been held. The league played games across two venues: the Thomas and Mack Center and Cox Pavilion, both located in Paradise, Nevada, which is near Las Vegas.

Format 
Five games were played between all 30 NBA teams from July 7 to 17. Each team played a total of five games. The top two teams from their first four games played in the Championship Game on July 17. Seeding for the Championship Game was determined by winning percentage considering tiebreakers. 

The 28 teams not playing in the Championship Game played a fifth game on either July 16 or 17. Consolation games were determined by various factors, including team rivalries, broadcast interest, and other scheduling considerations (e.g., timing of back-to-backs).

Tiebreak criteria 
1. Two Teams Tied - In the case of a tie in preliminary round records involving only two teams, the following criteria, in order, were utilized:

• Head-to-head matchup: The team that won the game between the two teams in the preliminary round, if applicable, receives the higher seed.

• Point differential: The team with the greater point differential receives the higher seed. 

• Random drawing: The higher seed shall be determined by a “coin flip.”

2. More Than Two Teams Tied - In the case of a tie in preliminary round records involving more than two teams, the following criteria, in order, were utilized:

• Point differential: The team with the greater point differential receives the higher seed.

• Random drawing: The higher seed shall be determined by a “coin flip.”

Teams 

 Atlanta Hawks
 Boston Celtics
 Brooklyn Nets
 Charlotte Hornets
 Chicago Bulls
 Cleveland Cavaliers
 Dallas Mavericks
 Detroit Pistons
 Denver Nuggets
 Golden State Warriors
 Houston Rockets
 Indiana Pacers
 Los Angeles Clippers
 Los Angeles Lakers
 Memphis Grizzlies
 Miami Heat
 Milwaukee Bucks
 Minnesota Timberwolves
 New Orleans Pelicans
 New York Knicks
 Oklahoma City Thunder
 Orlando Magic
 Philadelphia 76ers
 Phoenix Suns
 Portland Trail Blazers
 Sacramento Kings
 San Antonio Spurs
 Toronto Raptors
 Utah Jazz
 Washington Wizards

Games

Day 1

Influencer Tournament 
The NBA 2K23 Summer League Influencer Tournament was held on July 7 at the Cox Pavilion before the first slate of games.

It featured the following influencers: Adrianna Brown, Austin J. Mills, Bionic Brooks, Bone Collector, Bree Green, Caleb Nash Feemster, Cam Wilder, Christopher CRSWHT Egan, Chris Staples, DC Heat, DJ Clue, Grace Hunter, Jake Randall, Jenna Bandy, Jeremy Jones, Jordan Southerland, Kris London, Marcelas Howard, Maxwell Pearce, Pete Randall, Sniper Jones, Trey Uno Armstrong, and Whit3 Iverson.

Day 2

Day 3

Day 4

Day 5

Day 6

Day 7

Day 8

Day 9

Day 10

Day 11

References 

Summer League
2022
2022–23 in American basketball by league
2022 in sports in Nevada
July 2022 sports events in the United States